Arno Menses is a Dutch musician, lead vocalist for the progressive rock band Subsignal.

Bonebag
Menses, best known for being the lead vocalist of the bands Subsignal and Sieges Even, started out as a drummer for the band Bonebag, who released their debut "Noli me Tangere" in 2007. He played drums on all tracks and provided backup vocals on all songs on the album. Bonebag quickly disbanded following their tour to the album.

Sieges Even
Arno joined Sieges Even during their extensive hiatus in 2003. His first album with the band was The Art of Navigating by the Stars. The album was noted as a departure in sound from their previous two albums and incorporated a longer composition and more melody than before. In 2007, they released their second album with Menses, the album called Paramount.

In 2008, they released their first live album called Playgrounds.

Following the tour supporting the American AOR giant JOURNEY, the band had internal differences and disbanded. The Holzwarth brothers went on to join different bands while Menses and Steffen thought of forming a band of their own.

Subsignal
Following the disbandment of Sieges Even, Arno Menses and guitarist Markus Steffen formed a band called Subsignal. They have released five albums, a best of album and one live DVD since their formation: Beautiful & Monstrous in 2009 followed by Tours opening up for Krautrockers Jane and Canadian prog-rock legends Saga Touchstones in 2011 (Entering at #53 in the German charts), the live album and DVD Out There Must Be Something, Paraiso in 2013 (entering at #74 in the German charts)  The Beacons of Somewhere Sometime in 2015, La Muerta 2018 (entering at #51 in the German charts)  and A Canopy of Stars - the best of Subsignal 2009 - 2015, also in 2018.

Other musical appearances

Android Soul – Disappointing Paradise (2008)

Roel van Helden - RvH (2009)

Another Perfect Day — The Gothenburg Post Scriptum (2010)

Soul Secret - Closer To Daylight (2011)

Dreamscape - Everlight (2012)

Extrovert - Ascension (2015)

Blind Ego - Liquid (2016)

Entering Polaris (2018)

Kalle Wallner - Voices (2022)

Project: Patchwork: Ultima Ratio (2022)

References

Dutch male singers
Year of birth missing (living people)
Living people
Musicians from Rotterdam